Kuzhnik is a rural locality (a selo) in Kuzhniksky Selsoviet, Tabasaransky District, Republic of Dagestan, Russia. The population was 1,807 as of 2010. There are 6 streets.

Geography 
Kuzhnik is located 16 km west of Khuchni (the district's administrative centre) by road. Uluz is the nearest rural locality.

References 

Rural localities in Tabasaransky District